Nezhegol is a rural locality (a selo) in Shebekinsky District, Belgorod Oblast, Russia. The population was 1,156 as of 2010. There are 11 streets.

Geography 
Nezhegol is located 17 km east of Shebekino (the district's administrative centre) by road. Voznesenovka is the nearest rural locality.

References 

Rural localities in Shebekinsky District